Witfontein is a town in Sekhukhune District Municipality in the Limpopo province of South Africa.

References

Populated places in the Elias Motsoaledi Local Municipality